Diego de León may refer to:
 Diego de León, 1st Count of Belascoáin (1807–1841), Spanish military figure
 Diego de León (Madrid Metro), a station of the Madrid Metro